Pepito, the diminutive version of the Spanish name Pepe, may refer to:
 Pepito Arriola (1896–1954), Spanish child prodigy pianist and violinist
 César Tovar (1940–1994), Major League Baseball player, nicknamed "Pepito"
 Pepito (comics), an Italian comic created by Luciano Bottaro
 Pepito, the largest cat in the world, a minor character in The Simpsons TV series
 Pepito (Squee), a character in the comic book Squee
 Pepito, the character Rat's violent sock puppet in the comic strip Pearls Before Swine
 Pepito, a character in the 1959 animated TV series Bucky and Pepito
 Pepito, a character in the webcomic Something Positive
 Pepito, a character in Madeline by Ludwig Bemelmans
 Pepito Manaloto, a Philippine television sitcom broadcast on GMA Network
 Pépito, an opéra comique of 1853, music by Jacques Offenbach
 Pepito, manager and companion of Josephine Baker mentioned in "The Hungry Heart", by Jean-Claude Baker
 Pepito, the main character in the 2017 movie Yo Soy Pepito"
 A sandwich common in Venezuela
 Pepito, a flying creature from  2017 animated film Coco.
 Palm (companion), codenamed "Pepito"
 Tropical Depression Pepito (2020)
 a type of biscuit sold in France by LU

See also
 Pepe (disambiguation)
 Pepita, roasted seed of pumpkin or other squash